The 2009–10 UTEP Miners men's basketball team represented the University of Texas at El Paso in the 2009–10 college basketball season. This was head coach Tony Barbee's fourth season at UTEP. The Miners competed in Conference USA and played their home games at the Don Haskins Center. They finished the season 26–7, 15–1 in CUSA play to win the regular season championship. They advanced to the championship game of the 2010 Conference USA men's basketball tournament before losing to Houston. They received and at–large bid to the 2010 NCAA Division I men's basketball tournament, earning a 12 seed in the west region, where they would lose to 5 seed and AP #11 Butler in the first round. UTEP averaged 8,697 fans per game, ranking 58th nationally.

Roster
Source

Schedule and results
Source
All times are Mountain

|-
!colspan=9| Exhibition

|-
!colspan=9| Regular Season

|-
!colspan=9| 2010 Conference USA men's basketball tournament

|-
!colspan=10| 2010 NCAA Division I men's basketball tournament

References

UTEP Miners
UTEP
UTEP Miners men's basketball seasons